Telegram Corporation was a Canadian media company created under a joint venture between John Bassett's Toronto Telegram newspaper and businessman John David Eaton (a member of the prominent Eaton family), as one of three co-owners of CFTO-TV in 1960. When the Toronto Telegram was shut down in 1971, the company was renamed Baton Broadcasting Incorporated (after the Bassett and Eaton families).

Baton Broadcasting was renamed once again to Baton Broadcast System (BBS) in 1994. The Eatons sold their media stake in 1998, and the Bassetts retained sole control of BBS. That same year, BBS was renamed CTV.

References

CTV Television Network
Mass media companies established in 1960
Defunct broadcasting companies of Canada
1960 establishments in Ontario
Mass media companies disestablished in 1998
1998 disestablishments in Ontario